Fonda is an Italian surname. Notable people with the surname include:
Bridget Fonda (b. 1964), US film actress
Douw Fonda (1700–1780), early settler in the Mohawk Valley, New York
Enrico Fonda (1892-1929), Italian artist
Gloria Fonda (1896-1978), US film actress
Henry Fonda (1905–1982), US stage and film actor
Jane Fonda (b. 1937), US film actress
Joe Fonda (b. 1954), US musician
Lorenzo Fonda (b. 1979), Italian-born US film director and artist
Luciano Fonda (1931-1998), Italian physicist
Mary Alice Fonda (1837-1897; pen name, "Octavia Hensel"), American musician, linguist, author, critic
Olga Fonda (b. 1982), Russian-born US actress and model (née Olga Tchakova)
Pavel Fonda (b. 1942), Italian psychiatrist
Peter Fonda (1940-2019), US film actor

Italian-language surnames